Dodson Lomax Mitchell (1868-1939) was an American stage and screen actor and author. He was a nephew to actress Maggie Mitchell and cousin of theatre director Julian Mitchell.

Selected filmography
Are You a Mason? (1915)
Fifty-Fifty (1916)
Deadline at Eleven (1920)
The Little Giant (1926)
Road to Paradise (1930) (*writer of play)

References

External links
 
 
 
 portraits (New York Public Library, Billy Rose collection)

1868 births
1939 deaths
Male actors from Memphis, Tennessee
American stage actors